This article is the list of equipment of the Royal Thai Navy, including active and historic equipments. The equipment of the Royal Thai Navy have been produced in many countries, such as Canada, China, Germany, Italy, Japan, Netherlands, Singapore, South Korea, Spain, United States, and the United Kingdom.

Ships

Submarine

Helicopter carrier

Amphibious warfare ship

Frigate

Corvette

Offshore patrol vessel

Patrol craft

Training ship

Landing craft utility

Replenishment ship

Minesweeper

Research and survey vessel

Tugboat

Riverine patrol boat

Armaments

Aircraft 
Related article:Royal Thai Naval Air Division

Navy Infantry weapons 
Related article: List of equipment in Royal Thai Marine Corps
Related article: List of equipment in RECON battalion
Related article: List of equipment in Royal Thai Navy SEALs team

Historical equipment

Ships

Armaments

Future equipment

Procurement plans
The Thai navy has been lobbying for submarines for years. In January 2017 the Thai National Legislative Assembly tacitly approved the expenditure of 13.5 billion baht (US$383 million) to buy one Chinese S26T submarine, a derivative of China's Yuan Class Type 039A submarine. The S26T submarines are diesel-powered with a displacement of 2,400–3,000 tonnes. It is projected to be the first of a three-boat, US$1 billion acquisition. The cabinet approved one submarine purchase on 18 April 2017 with a budget of 13.5 billion baht (US$393 million), including weapons systems, spare parts and technology transfer. The sub is expected to be delivered in about 2023. The Thai navy's submarine squadron has trained in Germany and South Korea but has no submarines—its last sub was decommissioned in 1950. It does have a submarine headquarters: in July 2014 a US$17.3 million submarine headquarters and training center was opened at the Thai navy's largest port in Sattahip. Prime Minister Prayut Chan-o-cha has explained that Thailand will buy submarines, "not for battle, but so that others will be in awe of us." Deputy Prime Minister and Defence Minister Gen Prawit Wongsuwon said that "...growing territorial threats and an increasing number of maritime missions has prompted the navy to strengthen its submarine units." There are plans to base one submarine at Mahidol Adulyadej Naval Dockyard in Sattahip District, Chonburi, one at a submarine dockyard off the Sattahip coastline, and one on the Andaman coast, in either Krabi or Phang Nga.

Future fleet

See also 
 Royal Thai Marine Corps
 Air and Coastal Defence Command
 Royal Thai Naval Air Division

References 

Royal Thai Navy
Military equipment of Thailand
Thai Navy